Rarities is a compilation album by Australian rock band The Living End. The album features demos and acoustic versions of songs that were previously unreleased, and was first available on a range of online music stores for 5 days from 15 to 19 November 2008, at which point it was taken off the stores for no confirmed reason. The album was released exclusively online, until its physical release as part of a double CD deluxe edition of the band's fifth studio album, White Noise, on 27 February 2009.

Track listing

References

The Living End albums
2004 compilation albums